William King Tweedie (1803–1863) was an historian, biographer and a minister of the Free Church of Scotland Tolbooth Church, Edinburgh.

Life

He was born in Ayr on 8 May 1803, the eldest son of John Tweedie and Janet King. His parents moved to Buenos Aires in South America while William was young and he was left in the care of an aunt in Maybole. He never saw his parents again, and was effectively abandoned.

He studied Divinity at Edinburgh, Glasgow and St Andrews University. He was licensed to preach as a minister of the Church of Scotland by the Presbytery of Arbroath in 1828.

He was ordained as minister of the Scots Church at London Wall in 1832. In 1836 he was translated to Aberdeen South Parish  and in March 1842 to the Tolbooth Church on the Royal Mile in Edinburgh in place of Rev Thomas Randall Davidson, but as first minister of the recently completed masterpiece by James Gillespie Graham and Pugin. He left the established church in the Disruption of 1843 and was thereafter a minister of the Free Church of Scotland.

Leaving with a large portion of the Tolbooth parish congregation they purchased the pre-existing Secession Church on Infirmary Street. He lived at 50 George Square, Edinburgh.

From 1848 to 1862 he was Convenor of the Foreign Mission Committee of the Free Church. He was awarded an honorary Doctor of Divinity by St Andrews University in 1852.

He moved to 3 Fingal Place in the Grange around 1845 but returned to George Square in later life.

The church sold the Infirmary Street church in 1851 and used temporary accommodation until a new church was built circa 1855: a very modest hall on the rear garden of an unfinished Georgian house on the north side of St Andrew Square.

He died at 15 George Square, Edinburgh on 24 March 1863. He is buried in the Grange Cemetery in south Edinburgh. The grave lies on the outer north wall.

Family

On 11 May 1835 he married Margaret Bell (1803-3 March 1885) in London. She was daughter of Hugh Bell, of Old Garphar, Straiton, Ayrshire, and had five children.

Their children included:

Major-General, C.S.I., served in Indian Mutiny Sepoy mutiny, held numerous military and political appointments in India, Political Resident in Turkish Arabia, and H.M. Consul-General at Baghdad.
 John Tweedie (1838-1897) of the Bengal Civil Service born 30 July 1838 - died 3 May 1897
 Maria Meredith Tweedie (born 20 May 1841)
 Margaret Bell Tweedie (4 November 1843)
 Jessie Ann Tweedie (born 17 September 1845)

Publications
Life of Rev John MacDonald, India
Calvin and Servetus
Lights and Shadows of the Life of Faith
Jerusalem and its Environs
Ruined Cities of the East
Fifteen Years of Foreign Missions
The Life and Work of Earnest Men
The Sacrament of Baptism
Seed Time and Harvest: or Sow Well and Reap Well. A Book for the Young. Preface by H. L. Hastings
Home: A Book for the Family
Pathways of Many Pilgrims; or, Lights and Shadows in the Christian Life
Glad Tidings; or the Gospel of Peace. A series of meditations for Christian Disciples. Preface by H. L. Hastings
A Lamp to the Path: or the Word of God in the Heart, the Home, the Workshop and the Market-place. Introduction by H. L. Hastings
Of the Free Tolbooth Church, Edinburgh<ref>

References

Citations

Sources

External links 
 Collections in The National Archives

1803 births
1863 deaths
19th-century Ministers of the Free Church of Scotland
Scottish religious writers
Scottish biographers
19th-century Scottish historians
Burials at the Grange Cemetery
19th-century Ministers of the Church of Scotland